Industrial Press, Inc., is a privately held corporation headquartered in South Norwalk, Connecticut. Its primary areas of business are publishing technical books for engineering, technology, and manufacturing.

The company was founded in New York City in 1883, and moved to Connecticut in 2013.

Industrial Press's flagship title is the Machinery's Handbook. It is a reference for mechanical and manufacturing engineers, designers, draftsmen, toolmakers, and machinists.

External links

Book publishing companies based in Connecticut
Companies based in Norwalk, Connecticut
Publishing companies based in New York City
Publishing companies established in 1880
1880 establishments in New York (state)
Privately held companies based in Connecticut